Denmark participated in the 2010 Summer Youth Olympics in Singapore.

Thirty Danish athletes competed in eleven sports: archery, athletics, badminton, canoeing, cycling, fencing, handball, judo, rowing, sailing and tennis.

Medalists

Archery

Boys

Girls

Mixed Team

Athletics

Boys
Field Events

Girls
Track and Road Events

Badminton

Boys

Girls

Canoeing

Girls

Note: In sprint repechages, the fastest 6 boats out of 10 qualified. In slalom repechages, the fastest 3 out of 10 boats qualified.

Cycling

Mixed team

*Denmark awarded −5 points for finishing with all three riders

Fencing

Boys

Handball

Girls

Judo

Boys

Team

Rowing

Boys

Sailing

Girls

Tennis

References

External links
Competitors List: Denmark

2010 in Danish sport
Nations at the 2010 Summer Youth Olympics
Denmark at the Youth Olympics